NASCAR Revolution, stylized as NASCAR revolution, is a racing video game developed by Stormfront Studios and published by EA Sports (a division of Electronic Arts). It is part of the EA Sports NASCAR Racing Game series, being the third title in the game series. The game was released in 1999 for Microsoft Windows 95 and Windows 98, unlike previous games in the franchise that were console exclusives. It features race car drivers from the 1998 NASCAR Cup Series season (in the original release) or the 1999 season (in NASCAR Revolution SE), such as Kyle Petty and Dale Earnhardt.

Reception

The game received mixed to negative reviews according to the review aggregation website GameRankings.

It was a finalist for the "Sports Game of the Year" award at AIAS' Second Interactive Achievement Awards, which went to ''FIFA 99.

References

External links
Official website

1999 video games
NASCAR video games
North America-exclusive video games
EA Sports games
Video games developed in the United States
Windows games
Windows-only games
Multiplayer and single-player video games
Stormfront Studios games